Jean-Nicolas Servan, also known as Giovanni Niccolò Servandoni (2 May 1695 – 19 January 1766) was an Italian decorator, architect, scene-painter, firework designer and trompe-l'œil specialist.

He was born in Florence, the son of a French carriage driver.

Career 
He was educated as an artist of perspective in Rome and was a pupil of Giovanni Paolo Panini worked in London as a set designer at the recently founded Royal Academy of Music but moved to Paris in 1724, where he became director of decorations (1724 to 1742)  at the Paris Opera, at that time situated in the Théâtre du Palais-Royal. He became a member of the Académie Royale de Peinture et de Sculpture in 1731. His activity was considerable, whether as a painter or as an inventor of scenic contrivances for fêtes at the marriage of royal personages. He decorated public festivals in England, France, and Portugal.

During the years 1738–1743 and 1754–1758, Servandoni produced a series of successful theatrical productions much in the style of seventeenth-century machine plays, with an emphasis on elaborate changes in décor and special effects, often set to music.  Unlike the machine plays of the seventeenth century, Servandoni's productions used pantomime rather than dialog, with a description of the story provided in the program. His productions were typically based on well-known stories from literature and mythology such as the "Spectacle de Pandore" (1739) which told the tale of Prometheus and Pandora or "La forêt enchantée" (1754) which was inspired by Torquato Tasso's "Jerusalem Delivered".
He died in Paris in the early 1766.

French Works
Saint Sulpice, façade.

Belgian Works 
 D'Ursel Castle
 Mesen Castle
 Egmont Palace

Author 
Description abregée de l'eglise Saint Pierre de Rome (Paris, 1738)
La Relation de la répresentation de la forêt enchantée sur le théâtre des Tuileries, le 31 mars 1754.

References
Notes

Sources
 

Guidoboni, Francesco (2016) doctoral thesis Giovanni Niccolò Servandoni (1695-1766) architetto

Bibliography
 Cristiano Marchegiani, « Servandoni (Servandon), Giovanni Niccolò Girolamo (Jean-Nicolas-Jérôme) », in Dizionario Biografico degli Italiani, vol. 92, Roma, Istituto dell'Enciclopedia Italiana, 2018, pp. 264–268.

External links
 

1695 births
1766 deaths
Architects from Florence
18th-century French architects
18th-century Italian painters
Italian male painters
Quadratura painters
French scenic designers
Italian scenic designers
18th-century Italian male artists